Makkal Sakthi or Makkal Sakthi Katchi (Lok Satta Party) is a political party in India founded by Nagabhairava Jaya Prakash Narayan.  It will contest 40 constituencies in 18 districts.  The party is supported by the non-government organisation 5th Pillar who are famous for issuing zero rupees notes to fight corruption.  The party is now headed by Vijay Anand in the state of Tamil Nadu.

References

Political parties in Tamil Nadu
Political parties with year of establishment missing